Klembów   is a village in Wołomin County, Masovian Voivodeship, in east-central Poland. It is the seat of the gmina (administrative district) called Gmina Klembów.

The village has a population of 920.

References

Villages in Wołomin County